Patricio de la Escosura Morrogh (5 November 1807–1878) was a Spanish politician, journalist, playwright and author associated with the Romantic school.

1807 births
1878 deaths
Spanish male dramatists and playwrights
Members of the Royal Spanish Academy
19th-century Spanish journalists
Male journalists
19th-century Spanish dramatists and playwrights
19th-century Spanish male writers